Brandon Butler (born September 11, 1996) is an American actor. He is known for portraying Scott Reed in the Netflix series 13 Reasons Why and Brady Finch in the Netflix series Trinkets.

Filmography

Film

Television

References

External links 
 

1996 births
Living people
American male film actors
American male television actors
American male child actors
People from Frankfort, Illinois
Male actors from Illinois
21st-century American male actors